Asa Di Var, (Gurmukhi: ਆਸਾ ਦੀ ਵਾਰ) meaning “A ballad of hope,” is a collection of 24 stanzas (pauris) in the Guru Granth Sahib, from ang 462 to ang 475.

Some people argue that the founder of Sikhism, Guru Nanak Dev, wrote the first 9 stanzas together on one occasion and later wrote 15 more on a different occasion; however, some Sikh scholars believe that the whole vaar was written at the same place as the vaar itself proceeds in a definite uniformity. The whole vaar was compiled by Guru Arjan, the fifth Guru, in 1604 AD.

Overview 
When Guru Arjan was compiling the Guru Granth Sahib, he added a few sloks of Guru Nanak and in some cases Guru Angad, the second Guru. These sloks are tied together in a way that they relate to the same theme as highlighted in the pauri. In its present form, the Asa Di Var contains a few more shabads recited by Guru Ram Das, the fourth Sikh Guru.

References

External links
Read Asa Di Vaar Bani in Punjabi
Guru Gobind Singh Foundation
In English Text
Sound Recording by Dya Singh group 2006 with full text, 2CD boxed set
Asa di Var from Introduction to Sikhism
Asa di Var in Gurmukhi - Romanized - English (needs Gurmukhi Font)

Audio
Gurmej Singh (Retired Hazoori Raagi) - Asa De Var
Amrik Singh Zakhmi - Asa Di War
Satvinder Singh & Harvinder Singh - Asa Di Waar
Bakshish Singh (Patiala Wale) - Asa Di War Live at Ross Street Temple
Surjan Singh Ragi - Asa Di War
Gurmail Singh (Hazoori Ragi Sri Darbar Sahib Amritsar) - Asa Di War
ProudtobeSikh
Sound sample of a Shabad
Dharam Singh Nihang Singh's exegesis of Aasa Ki Vaar

Adi Granth
Sikh scripture
Sikh terminology